Elkana or Elqana is an Israeli settlement and local council in the north-western Samarian hills in the West Bank, located 3.1 km to the east of the Green Line and the city of Rosh HaAyin. It was founded in 1977 by a group from Gush Emunim of religious and non-religious Jews, and by July 2020 it had a population of 3858.

Israeli settlements in the West Bank are considered illegal under international law, but the Israeli government disputes this.

History
According to ARIJ, Israel confiscated 1,626 dunams of land from the Palestinian village of Mas-ha in 1977 in order to construct Elkana.

Elkana was established as one of the earliest settlements after 64 Knesset members signed a bill to allow the use of state land in the area for construction. On 1 May 1977, fifteen men climbed the hill and started preparing the area for families for the official day on 10 May. Amongst the first families to move to the settlement was that of the former Chief of Staff Shaul Mofaz ten days later. Elkana became the fourth community to be established by the Seventeenth government of Israel headed by Yitzhak Rabin, following the Kadum outpost, Ofra, and Ma'ale Adumim. A few months later, forty families had moved into prefabricated home's called 'ashkubiot' and after two years, over a hundred families lived in the village.

In 1983, the first permanent structures were built as the village was divided into different neighbourhoods named after the number of homes planned in each one: 220, 165, 80, and 34 (also called Bnai Elkana). More recently, two newer neighbourhoods have been built; One on the northern side of the town as well as another smaller one to the west.

In November 2013 Israel published plans for 283 new homes to be built in Elkana. In January 2014 they received permission for the homes, and on 5 September 2014 announced tenders for the units.

The town was named after the nearby Nahal Qana and Elkanah, father of Samuel (1 Samuel 1:1), who is believed to have lived in the area. Virtually all of the town's residents are religious of a primarily national religious orientation.

The Trans-Samarian Highway previously cut through the town until 2000 when the road, which now skirts to the south, was upgraded.

Notable residents
Nissan Slomiansky (b. 1946), Member of the Knesset
Shaul Yahalom (b. 1947), Former Member of the Knesset

See also
Mas-ha

References

Israeli settlements in the West Bank
Local councils in Israel
Mixed Israeli settlements
Populated places established in 1977
1977 establishments in the Israeli Military Governorate